Flavien Giniaux (born 25 June 2002) is a French pair skater. With his skating partner, Oxana Vouillamoz, he is the 2022 Trophée Métropole Nice Côte d'Azur bronze medalist and placed tenth at the 2022 World Junior Championships.

Personal life 
Flavien Giniaux was born on 25 June 2002 in Le Chesnay and resides in Caen, France.

Career

Early years 
Giniaux placed tenth in junior men's singles at the French Junior Championships in February 2020.

He teamed up with Switzerland's Oxana Vouillamoz at the suggestion of Bruno Massot. Coached by Massot, they began skating together in August 2020 at the Tissot Arena in Bienne, Switzerland. Vouillamoz/Giniaux trained but did not compete in their first season together.

2021–22 season 
By the 2021–22 season, Vouillamoz/Giniaux had relocated with Massot to Caen and had decided to skate for France. The two made their competitive debut in early September, placing tenth at the 2021–22 ISU Junior Grand Prix event in Košice, Slovakia.
In April, they finished tenth at the 2022 World Junior Championships in Tallinn, Estonia.

2022–23 season 
Beginning their season on the 2022–23 ISU Junior Grand Prix circuit, Vouillamoz/Giniaux placed fifth in the Czech Republic and fourth in Poland. They made their senior international debut in October, winning bronze at the Trophée Métropole Nice Côte d'Azur.

Programs

With Vouillamoz

Competitive highlights 
GP: Grand Prix; CS: Challenger Series; JGP: Junior Grand Prix

Pair skating with Vouillamoz

Single skating

References

External links 
 
 

2002 births
French male pair skaters
Living people
People from Le Chesnay